Joseph Manuel María Joaquin Micheltorena y Llano (8 June 1804 – 7 September 1853) was a brigadier general of the Mexican Army, adjutant-general of the same, governor, commandant-general and inspector of the department of Las Californias, then within Mexico. Micheltorena was the last non-Californian Mexican governor before Californian native son Pío Pico took office.

Personal life
Micheltorena was born in 1804 in Oaxaca de Juárez, Oaxaca, Mexico, into a prominent Basque family. His parents were Army Captain Joseph Eusebio Micheltorena (who in 1819 was included among a list of notable foreigners in Mexico), and Catarina Gertrudis Llano. He was baptized at five days old at Oaxaca Cathedral. His grandparents were Joseph de Micheltorena (Mitxeltorena) and María Encarnación de Herrera (paternal), and Joseph Augustín de Llano and María Romero (maternal).

Career

Micheltorena was appointed governor of California by Mexican President Antonio López de Santa Anna and served from 30 December 1842, until his ouster in 1845.

In 1844, while he was governor, he granted Rafael Cacho the 8,701-acre land of Rancho San Geronimo. In 1846, Cacho sold the land to Joseph Warren Revere, who used it as a plantation wherein he enslaved Coast Miwok people of Marin County, California.

Micheltorena continued previous governors' policy of large land grants ("ranchos"). He faced criticism, opposition, and eventually rebellion by the Californios who wanted local-born governors.

Micheltorena brought with him from Mexico a group of soldiers that included criminals, and who were derisively referred to by some as cholos, to enforce his policies. Micheltorena was defeated  at the 1845 Battle of Providencia, left California, and was succeeded by Pío Pico as governor.

References

Further reading
 

1804 births
1853 deaths
People from Oaxaca City
Mexican people of Basque descent
Californios
Governors of Mexican California
Mexican generals
Mexican people of the Bear Flag Revolt
People of the Conquest of California
19th-century American politicians